Arhopala atosia  is a species of butterfly belonging to the lycaenid family described by William Chapman Hewitson in 1869. It is found in Southeast Asia - Borneo, Sumatra, Bangka, Pulau Laut (A. a. atosia), Thailand, Indochina, Peninsular Malaya, Singapore (A. a. malayana Bethune-Baker, 1903), Burma (A. a. aria (Evans, 1932)), Langkawi, Mergui (A. a. jahara Corbet, 1941) and Palawan (A. a. aricia (Staudinger, 1889)).

Subspecies
Arhopala atosia atosia (Borneo, Sumatra, Bangka, Pulau Laut)
Arhopala atosia malayana Bethune-Baker, 1903 (Thailand, Indo-China, Peninsular Malaysia, Singapore)
Arhopala atosia aria (Evans, 1932) (Burma)
Arhopala atosia jahara Corbet, 1941 (Langkawi, Mergui)
Arhopala atosia aricia (Staudinger, 1889) (Palawan)

References

Arhopala
Butterflies described in 1869
Butterflies of Asia
Taxa named by William Chapman Hewitson